The 2005–06 season was the 126th season of competitive football by Rangers.

Overview
Rangers played a total of 52 competitive matches during the 2005–06 season. Their start to the season was poor, winning only six league games out of the first 17. The period from October through to early December saw the team embark on one of the worst runs in their history, going ten games without a win. The league form scarcely improved as they failed to catch Hearts and so finished third in the league.

The domestic cup competitions were not productive as the club went out of the League Cup at the quarter final stage to Celtic, losing 2–0 at Celtic Park. They lost 3–0 also at Ibrox to Hibernian on 4 February 2006 to go out of the Scottish Cup in the fourth round and end their last hope of silverware for the season.

Rangers did however qualify for the Champions League group stages, and a 1–1 draw with Internazionale saw Rangers progress to the last 16 for the first time in the club's history, and the first Scottish team to do so. They were then eliminated by Spanish side Villarreal on the away goals rule.

This season turned out to be the last for manager Alex McLeish, with his imminent departure at the end of the season being announced in February following the Scottish Cup exit and a 2–0 defeat away to Aberdeen in the league.

Players

Squad information

Transfers

In

Total spending: £1.4m

Out

Total received: £0.75m

Squad statistics

Goal scorers

Last updated: 7 May 2006
Source: Match reports
Only competitive matches

Club

Board of directors

Coaching staff

Other staff

Matches

Scottish Premier League

UEFA Champions League

Scottish Cup

League Cup

Friendlies

Competitions

Overall

Scottish Premier League

Standings

Results summary

Results by round

UEFA Champions League

Group H

References

Rangers F.C. seasons
Rangers